Frederick Ferdinand Frink (August 25, 1911 – May 19, 1995) was an outfielder in Major League Baseball. Frink was born on August 25, 1911 in Macon, Georgia, and attended the University of Illinois at Urbana-Champaign. He played in two games in his major league career, with no at bats. Frink died on May 19, 1995 in Miami Springs, Florida.

External links

1911 births
1995 deaths
Major League Baseball outfielders
Philadelphia Phillies players
Baseball players from Georgia (U.S. state)
Sportspeople from Macon, Georgia